Protobothrops mangshanensis, commonly known as the Mangshan pit viper, Mangshan pitviper, Mt. Mang pitviper, or Mang Mountain pitviper, is a venomous pit viper species endemic to Hunan and Guangdong provinces in China. No subspecies are currently recognized. This is a nocturnal pit viper that is also known as the ''Mangshan iron-head snake'', ''Chinese pit viper'', and the ''Ironhead viper''. They eat frogs, birds, insects, and small mammals. They have a white tail tip that they wiggle to mimic a grub so that prey comes into striking range—a behaviour known as caudal luring. The venom causes blood clotting and corrodes muscle tissue and can kill people. Unusually for vipers, P. mangshanensis is oviparous with the female laying clutches of 13–21 eggs which she will guard until they hatch.

Description 

It is sometimes claimed that P. mangshanensis "spits" venom, in a manner similar to spitting cobras, but this has been disproven.

Geographic range
The species is known from the type locality: "Pingkeng, Mangshan (Mt. Mang), Yizhang County, Hunan", as well as from Ruyuan Yao Autonomous County in Guangdong province, both in southern China.

Conservation status
This species is listed as "Endangered" by the IUCN on the basis that this species has an extent of occurrence and area of occupancy both unlikely to exceed , it is known from two locations at risk from harvesting for the international pet trade and as a local delicacy, and there is a continuing decline in the number of mature individuals.

Habitat

Although first discovered in the Mt. Mang mountain range, it is also found in surrounding areas, primarily in subtropical montane forest with thick vegetation and cover. It is often found lying along lichen-covered logs and other structures along animal trails to ambush prey, and can also be found in the numerous limestone caves in the region. Winter temperatures in the region come close to freezing, whilst summer temperatures can reach  or higher.

Taxonomy
This species was originally described in the genus Trimeresurus. A new genus, Ermia, named in honor of Chinese herpetologist Zhao Ermi, was erected for the species in 1993. However, by coincidence, this generic name was already in use for a genus of locusts. The new generic name Zhaoermia was therefore proposed as a replacement name for Ermia. More recently, Guo et al. (2007) transferred the species to the genus Protobothrops, based on evidence T. mangshanensis is phylogenetically nested within the existing species of that genus. The species is therefore currently known as Protobothrops mangshanensis.

See also
 List of crotaline species and subspecies
 Snakebite

References

Further reading
Zhao, Ermi and Yuanhui Chen. 1990. Description of a new species of the genus Trimeresurus. (in Chinese with abstract in English.) Sichuan Journal of Zoology 9 (1): 11-12.

mangshanensis
Snakes of China
Endemic fauna of China
Reptiles described in 1990
Taxa named by Zhao Ermi
Endangered Fauna of China